Sajith Jagadnandan (born on May 25 in 1981) is an Indian film director who makes movies in Malayalam. His directorial debut was Ore Mukham. He works as associative director and Director.

Filmography

As Assistant Director

As director

References

External links 
 

Living people
Malayalam film directors
Film directors from Thiruvananthapuram
1981 births